The Burden of Proof is a 1918 American silent drama film directed by John G. Adolfi and Julius Steger and starring Marion Davies, Mary Richards and Eloise Clement.

Cast
 Marion Davies as Elaine Brooks 
 Mary Richards as Mrs. Brooks, her mother 
 Eloise Clement as Mrs. Durand 
 John Merkyl as Robert Ames 
 L. Rogers Lytton as George Blair 
 Willard Cooley as Frank Raymond 
 Fred Hearn as William Kemp 
 Fred Lenox as Butler 
 Maude Lowe as Maid

References

Bibliography
 Wesley Alan Britton. Onscreen and Undercover: The Ultimate Book of Movie Espionage. Greenwood, 2006.

External links

1918 films
1918 drama films
Silent American drama films
Films directed by John G. Adolfi
Films directed by Julius Steger
American silent feature films
1910s English-language films
American black-and-white films
Selznick Pictures films
Films based on works by Victorien Sardou
1910s American films